Brimnes is a small village in the municipality of Eidfjord in Vestland county, Norway.

Geography
The settlement lies on the south side of the Eid Fjord, an inner branch of the Hardanger Fjord. The ferry quay at Brimnes formerly served the ferry connection to Bruravik in the municipality of Ulvik. The ferry was part of the Fylkesbåtene company. The ferry service was discontinued after the construction of the Hardanger Bridge.

Name
The name of the village was standardized as Brimnes in 1990. The folklorist Halldor O. Opedal argued that the name Brimnes is incorrect, and that the correct form of the name should be Brynnes, connecting the name with the verb bryne 'to land (a boat)'.

References

Eidfjord
Ferry quays in Vestland
Villages in Vestland